Tarafa ( / ALA-LC: Ṭarafah ibn al-‘Abd ibn Sufyān ibn Sa‘d Abū ‘Amr al-Bakrī al-Wā’ilī), was a 6th century Arabian poet of the tribe of the Bakr.  He is one of the seven poets of the most celebrated anthology of ancient Arabic poetry, known as the Mo'allakat, however just one of his poems is included.  His fellow poets preserved in this work are Al-Nabigha, Antarah ibn Shaddad, Zuhayr bin Abi Sulma, 'Alqama ibn 'Abada and Imru' al-Qais.

Life
Ṭarafah was the half-brother or nephew of the elegist Al-Khirniq bint Badr. He traveled with his uncle Mutalammis to the court of the king of Al-Hirah, ʿAmr ibn Hind, and there became companion to the king's brother. According to one legend, having ridiculed the king in some verses he was sent with a letter to the ruler of Bahrayn, and, in accordance with the instructions contained in the letter, was buried alive.

Modern Translations

The Divans of the Six Ancient Arabic Poets, Ennabiga, 'Antara, Tharafa, Zuhair, 'Alqama and Imruulqais, Trübner & co., London, 1870 (in English); anthology of diwan (collected poems) edited by Wilhelm Ahlwardt.  
While some of his poems have been translated into Latin with notes by B. Vandenhoff (Berlin, 1895), both Tharafa and the poet Imru al-Qais were not included by Theodor Nöldeke in his Fünf Moallaqat, übersetzt und erklärt (Vienna, 1899-1901).
The seven golden odes of pagan Arabia : known also as the Moallakat; An English translation by Anne Blunt, Lady; Wilfrid Scawen Blunt (London, Chiswick Press, 1903).

References and external links

University at Albany: The Mu'Allaqa of Ibn Tarafa

Mohammadi Malayeri, M.: Tarikh va Farhang-e Iran Vol. I, Yazdan Publishers, Tehran 1372 Hsh. pp. 242، 267، 291، 292، 374.

Notes

External links

543 births
569 deaths
Bahraini poets
6th-century Arabic poets